The Ireland cricket team toured the United Arab Emirates in March 2017 to play two One Day International (ODI) matches. The matches were in preparation for Ireland's fixtures against Afghanistan in India that immediately followed the series. Ireland won the series 2–0.

Squads

ODI series

1st ODI

2nd ODI

References

External links
 Series home at ESPN Cricinfo

2017 in Irish cricket
2017 in Emirati cricket
International cricket competitions in 2016–17
Ireland 2017